Shigawake is a municipality in the Gaspésie–Îles-de-la-Madeleine region of the province of Quebec in Canada.
Shigawake is bordered to the west by Saint-Godefroi and to the east by Port-Daniel-Gascons.

The place name is taken from the river that flows through the village and is of Mi'kmaq origin, meaning either "land of the rising sun" or "white water".

The community of Shigawake is an eight kilometre stretch of coastline behind high red cliffs on the Gaspe Coast in the province of Québec. It has been officially designated as an Anglophone community among the largely Francophone population of Québec. Although it boasts a town council and mayor, it only hosts, among many small houses, a municipal building, the Anglican church of St Paul's, built in the 1860s, and a former Rectory converted to the Community Centre. The United Church was decommissioned in 2012, formerly the site of a temperance hall.

Shigawake has held the Shigawake Fair annually since 1909, also now paired with the Shigawake Music Festival which has showcased local talent.

Shigawake is also the site of Seagro, an organic fertiliser and composting firm.

The oldest farmhouse on the entire coast continuously inhabited by one family, the Old Homestead, was built early in the first decade of the 1800s. The founding of Shigawake is described in The Alford Saga, an eight book series of a romantic adventures by the late Paul Almond, an officer of the Order of Canada.

The area's fields, once so productive, are now used mainly for hay and the woods behind for harvests of sawlogs and firewood.

Demographics

Population

Mother tongue:
 English as first language: 58.2%
 French as first language: 37.3%
 English and French as first language: 4.5%
 Other as first language: 0%

People

Major S.V. Radley-Walters of The Sherbrooke Fusiliers was born in Shigawake, Quebec and in World War II was credited with 18 enemy tanks and assault guns put out of action. Tank-to-tank combat was rare in North-West Europe where tanks were more commonly used for infantry support missions. German armour, especially after the Battle of Normandy, was usually only found in small numbers opposite Canadian formations - certainly the flooded terrain in the Scheldt and the Rhineland was not often considered "good tank country."

Nonetheless, Major Sidney Radley-Walters, who commanded "A" Squadron of The Sherbrooke Fusilier Regiment, was credited with knocking out approximately 18 German tanks and assault guns during his wartime service. 

Sherbrooke Fusilier Regiment landed as the reserve tank battalion on D-Day. The next day, D+1, they underwent their baptism of fire. Rad would win the Military Cross for actions at Buron, Normandy in July, and the Distinguished Service Order for a number of actions later in the war.

War correspondent Ross Munro reported on Major Sidney Radley-Walters and his tank crew for the Canadian Press in August 1944.

Twenty-four-year-old Maj. S. V. (Woppy) Radley-Walters from the Gaspé Coast and his crew of four in their Sherman tank named "Caribou" are the leading tank destroyers in the Canadian armored units in France.

Their score now is 12 German tanks knocked out and the Caribou is still rolling with the same crew.

Radley Walters and his men are members of the Sherbrooke Fusiliers, a regiment which has made a fabulous name for itself in this Normandy campaign. They landed on D-Day with the regiment and have fought with it in every battle since.

The youthful major, who lived most of his life at Shigawake, Que., and whose father, Rev. A. R. Radley-Walters, now is rector of St. Peter’s in Quebec City, said they got their first German tank near Buron in the action there the day after landing. This was believed to be the first enemy tank destroyed in the battle of France.

See also
List of municipalities in Quebec

References

Incorporated places in Gaspésie–Îles-de-la-Madeleine
Municipalities in Quebec